The New York roof hook (or halligan hook) is a firefighting tool used mostly for rooftop operations including vertical and horizontal ventilation, pulling and prying.

One is angled at 45 degrees, the other at 90 degrees.

See also
Pike pole

References

Firefighter tools